The Drama King may refer to:

 The Drama King, a nickname of DJ Kay Slay
 "The Drama King", a song by Everclear from the 2006 album Welcome to the Drama Club